is a railway station in Wakayama, Wakayama Prefecture, Japan.

History
The station was opened in 1898 and was the original Wakayama station before Wakayamashi and the modern Wakayama stations were built.

Lines
West Japan Railway Company (JR West)
Kisei Main Line

Around the station

Adjacent stations

|-
!colspan=5|West Japan Railway Company (JR West)

Sources

External links
 Kiwa Station (West Japan Railway) 

Railway stations in Wakayama Prefecture
Railway stations in Japan opened in 1898